Turtle is an extinct town in Dent County, in the U.S. state of Missouri. The GNIS classifies it as a populated place.

A post office called Turtle was established in 1905, and remained in operation until 1954. The community took its name from nearby Turtle Pond, the habitat of many turtles.

References

Ghost towns in Missouri
Former populated places in Dent County, Missouri